Group C of the 2010 Fed Cup Europe/Africa Zone Group I was one of four pools in the Europe/Africa Zone Group I of the 2010 Fed Cup. Four teams competed in a round-robin competition, with the top team and the bottom team proceeding to their respective sections of the play-offs: the top team played for advancement to the World Group II Play-offs, while the bottom team faced potential relegation to Group II.

Sweden vs. Denmark

Hungary vs. Latvia

Sweden vs. Latvia

Hungary vs. Denmark

Sweden vs. Hungary

Denmark vs. Latvia

See also
Fed Cup structure

References

External links
 Fed Cup website

2010 Fed Cup Europe/Africa Zone